La Janda is a comarca (county, but with no administrative role) in the province of Cádiz, southern  Spain.

La Janda  is composed of the following municipalities:
Alcalá de los Gazules
Barbate
Benalup-Casas Viejas
Conil de la Frontera
Medina Sidonia
Paterna de Rivera
Vejer de la Frontera

External links
Mancomunidad de Municipios de la Comarca de La Janda
Asociación para el Desarrollo Rural del Litoral de la Janda

Comarcas of the Province of Cádiz